The Izvorul Mircii or Izvorul Mircea is a left tributary of the river Buda in Romania. Its source is on the western slope of Moldoveanu Peak (Făgăraș Mountains), the highest mountain peak in Romania.

References

Rivers of Romania
Rivers of Argeș County